Ronald Phillips (30 March 1947 – 18 April 2002) is an English former professional footballer who played as a midfielder.

Playing career
A left sided midfielder who also played as winger, Phillips began his career with Bolton Wanderers. After 145 league appearances and a loan spell with Chesterfield, Phillips joined Bury in 1975 for a two-year spell.

Early in 1977–78 Phillips joined Chester, where he became part of one of the club's most successful teams. His four-year stint at Sealand Road was largely successful, although Phillips did suffer the indignity of missing an open goal for Chester in a televised match at Blackpool in December 1978.

Phillips left Chester in February 1981 and briefly joined Chorley before signing for Barrow in the Alliance Premier League. But he suffered a serious leg injury shortly after signing and left him in plaster for six months, effectively ending his playing career at a serious level.

After his football career ended Phillips worked for an insurance company and later established a successful newsagents business. Unfortunately he began to suffer from depression, leading to his death from self-inflicted injuries in April 2002.

References

1947 births
2002 deaths
People from Worsley
English footballers
English Football League players
National League (English football) players
Association football wingers
Bolton Wanderers F.C. players
Chesterfield F.C. players
Bury F.C. players
Chester City F.C. players
Chorley F.C. players
Barrow A.F.C. players